Jeffrey James Kostoff (born August 19, 1965)  is an American former competition swimmer who represented the United States at two consecutive Summer Olympics.  At the 1984 Summer Olympics in Los Angeles, he finished in sixth place in the final of the men's 400-meter individual medley.  Four years later at the 1988 Summer Olympics in Seoul, South Korea, he advanced to the B Final of the 400-meter individual medley and finished ninth overall.

He held the national high school record in the 500-yard freestyle for 30 years (1983-2013), and held the Stanford record in the 1,650-yard freestyle for 21 years (1986–2007).

See also
 List of Stanford University people

References

External links
 Interview with Jeff Kostoff by Cheryl Wagner, from the Terrapin Masters Swim Club website; retrieved 2009-06-18.
 https://web.archive.org/web/20070830020456/http://www.ga.k12.pa.us/athletics/Winter/Swimming/Articles/crippenF3.htm

1965 births
Living people
American male freestyle swimmers
American male medley swimmers
Olympic swimmers of the United States
People from Upland, California
Stanford Cardinal men's swimmers
Swimmers at the 1983 Pan American Games
Swimmers at the 1984 Summer Olympics
Swimmers at the 1988 Summer Olympics
Pan American Games gold medalists for the United States
Pan American Games silver medalists for the United States
Pan American Games medalists in swimming
Medalists at the 1983 Pan American Games
20th-century American people